Vera V. Fischer is an Austrian mathematician specializing in set theory, mathematical logic, and infinitary combinatorics. She is a privatdozent in the Kurt Gödel Research Center for Mathematical Logic at the University of Vienna.

Education and career
Fischer completed her doctorate in 2008 at York University in Canada. Her dissertation, The Consistency of Arbitrarily Large Spread between the Bounding and the Splitting Numbers, was supervised by Juris Steprāns.

Before joining the Kurt Gödel Research Center, she worked at TU Wien from 2014 to 2015, where she led a project under the Lise Meitner Programme of the Austrian Science Fund.

Recognition
In 2017, Fischer won the Start-Preis of the Austrian Science Fund.
In 2018, she won the Prize of the Austrian Mathematical Society.

References

External links
Home page

Year of birth missing (living people)
Living people
Austrian mathematicians
Women mathematicians
Mathematical logicians
Women logicians
Combinatorialists
York University alumni
Academic staff of TU Wien
Academic staff of the University of Vienna